Felix Frank (born 8 February 1993) is a German sprint canoeist.

He won a medal at the 2019 ICF Canoe Sprint World Championships.

References

External links

1993 births
Living people
German male canoeists
ICF Canoe Sprint World Championships medalists in kayak